Jobbers Canyon Historic District was a large industrial and warehouse area comprising 24 buildings located in downtown Omaha, Nebraska, US. It was roughly bound by Farnam Street on the north, South Eighth Street on the east, Jackson Street on the south, and South Tenth Street on the west. In 1989, all 24 buildings in Jobbers Canyon were demolished, representing the largest National Register historic district loss to date.

About
The development of Jobber's Canyon mirrored Omaha's emergence as a central hub in the United States transportation system of the late 19th century and early 20th century. As the "Gateway to the West" serving several historic trails the Canyon housed several warehouses, grocers, and other dry goods outfitters for merchants throughout the Old West, particularly those along the Great Platte River Road. Railroad entrepreneurs, land speculators, and merchants built Jobbers Canyon from the 1870s onward. After George Francis Train landed the Union Pacific and Credit Foncier of America in Omaha, the city quickly turned into a transportation hub. Fruit and vegetable wholesalers, meatpackers, and all sorts of supply people created a range of businesses, building almost 24 densely congested buildings in a seven-block by three-block area in downtown Omaha.

Speaking in 1987 about Jobber's Canyon, J. Jackson Walter, president of the National Trust for Historic Preservation said, "The warehouse district, to the best of my knowledge, is certainly one of the Middle West's or the nation's finest collection of this sort of buildings."

Individual properties
All of Omaha's largest and most notable wholesale and mercantile businesses built massive warehouse structures in the area by the early 20th century. Six- and seven-story red brick buildings filled with jobbing houses towered over red brick streets, creating a canyon-like feeling and leading to the area becoming called "Jobber's Canyon". The brick-surfaced South Ninth Street was an important streetscape in the city, with brick and cobblestone streets, railroad spur lines, loading docks, and dock canopies all contributing to the character of Jobbers Canyon.

The area included the Kingman Implement Company building, also called the U.S. Tire building, located at 923 Farnam Street. It was built in 1900 as a six-story brick Renaissance Revival style structure. Kingman was a wholesale distributor of farm implements and vehicles. The Fairbanks, Morse and Company building at 923 Farnam Street was six stories tall. It was designed in 1907 by Omaha architects Fisher and Lawrie. In 1907 Fairbanks, Morse and Company was the largest manufacturer of gasoline, kerosene, and crude oil engines in the United States.

In 1906, architect Charles Cleves designed a six-story building for the U.S. Supply Company, which distributed of wholesale steam, water and plumbing supplies. The Dempster Building was a five-story Renaissance Revival-style warehouse designed by Omaha architect John Latenser, Sr. in 1902. The Dempster Mill Manufacturing Company started as a small retail pump and windmill shop in 1880 and eventually grew to become a major manufacturer of windmills and farm implements. Architects Fisher & Lawrie designed another six-story red brick warehouse structure in 1900 for the Lee-Glass-Andreesen Hardware Company, which originated in 1880 as Lee, Fried & Co. They were wholesalers of hardware, cutlery and tinware.

The eight-story Creighton Block was built for John A. Creighton to house the Byrne and Hammer Dry Goods Company. The most ornate building in Jobbers Canyon, this Renaissance Revival-style structure was designed by architect Charles Cleves. Today the Greenhouse Apartments at 900 Farnam Street are the only building left from the original Jobbers Canyon.

The Nash Block at 902 Farnam Street was designed by Thomas R. Kimball and built in 1907.

Demolition

Agriculture-related industries have always been important to Omaha's workforce. In addition to the meat industry, major employers have included the Kellogg Company and the Campbell Soup Company, which produces frozen Swanson and LeMenu products in Omaha. Exercising its influence, industry giant ConAgra transformed the skyline by demolishing Jobber's Canyon in 1989. At the time Charles M. Harper, chief executive of ConAgra, was asked about the district, and responded saying it was "some big, ugly red brick buildings". ConAgra's campus created almost  of office space.

Critics charged that the city was being "held hostage" by ConAgra, and that the city should not have to choose between its corporations and its historical legacies.

At the time Omaha's then-planning director, Marty Shukert, said it was more important to keep the city's downtown core healthy than to keep the historic district. "This development may not be a large thing to a city with multiple corporate headquarters and a large development industry," he said. "In a relatively small community like this, the effects of a growing, national corporation echo throughout the economy."

Trial
People for Responsible Omaha Urban Development (PROUD), with the National Trust for Historic Preservation as an intervening plaintiff, sued the Interstate Commerce Commission, the National Park Service and the Army Corps of Engineers in order to stop the demolition. The lawsuit alleged that the federal agencies failed to comply with the National Environmental Policy Act and the National Historic Preservation Act. The trial began in May 1988, and the district court immediately denied plaintiffs' request to stop demolition. The district court later ruled in favor of defendants on the merits, with a court of appeals affirming the district court decision in a brief opinion.

The court of appeal granted a partial stay of demolition during the appeals at a time when five buildings remained standing in the district. The injunction was later dissolved, and ultimately, all 24 buildings in the National Register-listed historic district were demolished, and the adjacent corporate campus was completed in 1992.

Legacy
Two historic districts listed on the National Register currently border the former Jobbers Canyon site. They include the Old Market Historic District, which was listed in 1979; and the Omaha Rail and Commerce Historic District, which was listed in 1996. The Union Station, Burlington Train Station and Bemis Bag Company Building are all nearby buildings that have been included on the Register individually, reflecting the area's significance.

The National Park Service officially delisted the non-existent Jobbers Canyon Historic District in 2002. In 2005 a restaurant called "Jobber's Canyon" opened in the Old Market, but later closed. Some critics charge that Omaha's dual losses of Jobbers Canyon and the Union Stockyards represent a blatant disregard for the city's working-class history.

In 2015, ConAgra moved its headquarters to Chicago and cut 1,500 of the 2,700 jobs at the Omaha offices.

See also
 National Register of Historic Places listings in Douglas County, Nebraska
 Transportation in Omaha
 Omaha Rail and Commerce Historic District
 Old Market Historic District
 Warehouses in Omaha MPS

References

Bibliography
 (2004) Omaha Since World War II: The Changing Face of the City (DVD). UNO Television.

External links
 Picture of downtown Omaha circa 1946, including the Jobbers Canyon in center.
 Slideshow of 3-dimensional model of Jobber's Canyon with present Greenhouse Apartments (former Nash Building) in detail. (This is a work in progress).

History of Downtown Omaha, Nebraska
Demolished buildings and structures in Omaha, Nebraska
Historic districts in Omaha, Nebraska
National Register of Historic Places in Omaha, Nebraska
Former National Register of Historic Places in Nebraska
Warehouse districts of the United States
Buildings and structures demolished in 1989